The Girl from Petrovka is a 1974 American comedy-drama film starring Goldie Hawn and Hal Holbrook, based on the novel by George Feifer. It is about an American journalist, Joe (Holbrook) who goes to the Soviet Union and meets  Oktyabrina (Hawn), an undocumented ballet dancer, which attracts the attention of the authorities.

Plot
Joe (Hal Holbrook) is a cynical American journalist assigned to work in the Soviet Union, where he meets Oktyabrina (Goldie Hawn), a spirited and erratic Russian ballet dancer who lives illegally without proper documents. Their ensuing romance opens new possibilities for both; but also draws the attention of the Soviet authorities.

Cast
 Goldie Hawn as Oktyabrina  
 Hal Holbrook as Joe  
 Anthony Hopkins as Kostya  
 Grégoire Aslan as Minister  
 Anton Dolin as Ignatievitch  
 Bruno Wintzell as Alexander  
 Zoran Andric as Leonid  
 Hanna Hertelendy as Judge  
 Maria Sukolov as Old Crone  
 Zitto Kazann as Passport Black Marketeer  
 Inger Jensen as Helga Van Dam  
 Raymond O'Keefe as Minister's Driver  
 Richard Marner as Kremlin Press Official  
 Michael Janisch as Police Chief Valinikov  
 Harry Towb as American Reporter

Production
Some filming was planned to take place in Belgrade, Yugoslavia, but Yugoslavia's Inex Films canceled its contract with Universal Pictures for undisclosed reasons just two weeks before shooting was set to begin, and production had to be moved to Vienna. Director Robert Ellis Miller suspected that Inex's decision was made under pressure from Moscow. A Yugoslavian official denied this, but did reveal that Inex was fearful of offending Russia with the film.

Reception
Nora Sayre of The New York Times wrote that "Goldie Hawn can't play a Russian" and Hal Holbrook "has little to do beyond shaking his head when he thinks of her smiling indulgently when he looks at her ... Certainly, neither performer has been aided by the script." Arthur D. Murphy of Variety wrote, "What 25 years of Cold War 'comedy' cliche and the latterday Nixon detente haven't done to make irrelevant 'The Girl From Petrovoka,' artless writing and direction have. This sixth Richard D. Zanuck-David Brown production for Universal stars Goldie Hawn, ineffective as a ponderous Russian version of a free spirit, and Hal Holbrook, who cannot alone make work such sterile and cornball comedy dramaturgy." Gene Siskel of the Chicago Tribune gave the film 1.5 stars out of 4. He called the story "insipid" and wrote of Goldie Hawn that "there is no way she can handle a Russian accent. Her dialect floats from the Volga to the Mississippi during a single sentence."

See also
 List of American films of 1974

References

External links

1974 films
1970s romantic comedy-drama films
American romantic comedy-drama films
Cold War films
Films scored by Henry Mancini
Films based on American novels
Films directed by Robert Ellis Miller
Films produced by Richard D. Zanuck
Films produced by David Brown
Films set in the Soviet Union
Films shot in Vienna
Universal Pictures films
The Zanuck Company films
1974 comedy films
1974 drama films
1970s English-language films
1970s American films